Alan Edward Mulgan  (18 May 1881 – 29 August 1962) was a New Zealand journalist, writer and broadcaster. He was born in Katikati, Bay of Plenty, New Zealand, of Protestant Irish
parents, on 18 May 1881, and died in Lower Hutt.

In 1935, Mulgan was awarded the King George V Silver Jubilee Medal. In the 1947 New Year Honours he was appointed an Officer of the Order of the British Empire for services to literature, journalism and broadcasting.

His father was Edward Ker Mulgan. Alan's elder son John Mulgan was also a writer and journalist.

Published works
 The New Zealand Citizen: An Elementary Account of the Citizen's Rights and Duties and the Work of Government (with E.K. Mulgan) (1914, and later editions)
 Three Plays of New Zealand (1922)
 Maori & Pakeha: A History of New Zealand (with A.W. Shrimpton) (1922, and later editions)
 The English of the Line and Other Verses (1925)
 New Zealand, Country and People: An Account of the Country and Its People (with Constance Clyde) (1925, and later editions)
 Home: A New Zealander's Adventure (1927, and later editions)
 Golden Wedding (1932)
 Spur of Morning (1934)
 Building in New Zealand: The Architect and His Service (1934) 
 A Pilgrim's Way in New Zealand (1935)
 Aldebaran and Other Verses (1937)
 The City of the Strait: Wellington and Its Province: A Centennial History (1939)
 First with the Sun (1939)
 Literature and Authorship in New Zealand (1943)
 From Track to Highway: A Short History of New Zealand (1944)
 Literature and Landscape in New Zealand (1946)
 Pastoral New Zealand: Its Riches and Its People: A Descriptive Survey of the Dominion's Farming (1946)
 The Māori in Picture: A Brief Survey of Māori Life Past and Present (1948)
 A Book of Australian and New Zealand Verse (edited, with Walter Murdoch) (1950)
 New Zealand Railways: Romance and Story (1954)
 The Making of a New Zealander (1958)
 Great Days in New Zealand Writing (1962)
 Golden Wedding, and Other Poems (1964)

References

External links
 Alan E. Mulgan's Australian theatre credits at AusStage
 Catalogue of National Library of New Zealand

1881 births
1962 deaths
New Zealand broadcasters
People from Katikati
New Zealand Officers of the Order of the British Empire
20th-century New Zealand journalists
20th-century New Zealand writers